Morinda fasciculata is a species of plant in the family Rubiaceae. It is endemic to Ecuador.

References

Endemic flora of Ecuador
fasciculata
Data deficient plants
Taxonomy articles created by Polbot